Lubeja Manor is a manor in Liezēre Parish, Madona Municipality in the historical region of Vidzeme, in Latvia.

History 
Lubey estate was an old possession of the Tiesenhausen noble family. George Tiesenhausen Helmold's son pledged this property in 1570 to Fromhold Ungern for 2000 marks, who seemed to have ceded his right to George Tolcke Von Fromhold Tiesenhausen redeemed his widow, who was married to Johann Neutstedt in a second marriage. In 1594 Lubey estate was confiscated at the beginning of the Swedish rule along with other Tiesenhausen estates because the owner had followed the Poles. In 1625 king Gustavus Adolphus of Sweden donates estate to captain Gottfried Falckenberg. On September 1, 1667, the assessor Johann Gottfried von Falckenberg sold Lubey to the Landrath and Colonel Otto von Mengden, whose grand son the General Lieutenant and Landrath Carl Friedrich Baron Mengden, for 5500 Thaler Alb, sold to the  Landrath Valentin Johann von Krüdener. Minister Burchard Alerius Constantin von Krüdener surrendered both estates on September 7, 1784, for 19,000 thalers to the district administrator Ludwig Wilhelm Grafen Mannteufel the Lubey united with the Gut Bersohn with which it has remained associated since then.

Lubeja manor estate existed until 1866 when according to new law it was reformed into Lubeja parish. Parish was dissolved in 1949.

See also
List of palaces and manor houses in Latvia
Vecpiebalga Castle

References

Manor houses in Latvia